The Tyulenovo field is a Bulgarian oil field that was discovered in 1951 and located on the continental shelf of the Black Sea. It began production in 1951 and produces oil and natural gas.

References

Black Sea energy
Oil fields of Bulgaria